Palatalization may refer to:
Palatalization (phonetics), the phonetic feature of palatal secondary articulation
Palatalization (sound change), the process of a sound change to a more palatal sound

Linguistics disambiguation pages